Trauermusik is a suite for viola and string orchestra, written on 21 January 1936 by Paul Hindemith at very short notice in memory of King George V of the United Kingdom, who died the previous night.  The title means "Mourning Music" or "Funeral Music" in English, but the work is always known by its German title.

Background
On 19 January 1936, Paul Hindemith travelled to London, intending to play his viola concerto Der Schwanendreher, with Adrian Boult and the BBC Symphony Orchestra in Queen's Hall, on 22 January.  This was to be the British premiere of the work.

However, just before midnight on 20 January, King George V died.  The concert was cancelled, but Boult and the BBC music producer Edward Clark still wanted Hindemith's involvement in any music that was broadcast in its place.  They debated for hours what might be a suitable piece, but nothing could be found, so it was decided that Hindemith should write something new.  The following day, from 11 a.m. to 5 p.m., Hindemith sat in an office made available to him by the BBC and wrote Trauermusik in homage to the late king.  It was written for viola and string orchestra (Der Schwanendreher employs a larger complement that includes woodwinds).  Trauermusik was performed that evening in a live broadcast from a BBC radio studio, with Boult conducting and the composer as soloist.

The music
Trauermusik consists of four very short movements. The first movement is marked Langsam.  The second movement (Ruhig bewegt) is less than a minute in length and the third is only slightly longer. The last movement is the heart of the work and in it, Hindemith quotes the chorale "Vor deinen Thron tret' ich hiermit" ("Here I stand before Thy throne"), well known in Germany via the harmonisation by Johann Sebastian Bach.  Hindemith was unaware at the time, but the tune was very familiar in England as the "Old 100th", to the words "All people that on Earth do dwell".

The piece also contains quotations from Symphony: Mathis der Maler and Der Schwanendreher.  Trauermusik immediately entered the repertoire of violists, as well as cellists and even violinists.

The Swiss philanthropist and music patron Werner Reinhart, to whom Hindemith had dedicated his Clarinet Quintet in 1923, later told Gertrud Hindemith "there was something Mozartian" about her husband's writing Trauermusik in half a day, and premiering it the same day. "I know no one else today who could do that", he said.

References

External links
 Michael Steinberg, ‘’The Concerto’’
 The Land of Lost Content
Stevenson, Joseph. [ "Trauermusik"], AllMusic.com.

Compositions for viola and orchestra
Compositions by Paul Hindemith
1936 compositions
Orchestral suites
Funerary and memorial compositions
Cultural depictions of George V